Shikimic acid, more commonly known as its anionic form shikimate, is a cyclohexene, a cyclitol and a cyclohexanecarboxylic acid. It is an important biochemical metabolite in plants and microorganisms. Its name comes from the Japanese flower shikimi (the Japanese star anise, Illicium anisatum), from which it was first isolated in 1885 by Johan Fredrik Eykman. The elucidation of its structure was made nearly 50 years later.

Biosynthesis 
Phosphoenolpyruvate and erythrose-4-phosphate condense to form 3-deoxy-D-arabinoheptulosonate-7-phosphate (DAHP), in a reaction catalyzed by the enzyme DAHP synthase. DAHP is then transformed to 3-dehydroquinate (DHQ), in a reaction catalyzed by DHQ synthase. Although this reaction requires nicotinamide adenine dinucleotide (NAD) as a cofactor, the enzymic mechanism regenerates it, resulting in the net use of no NAD.

DHQ is dehydrated to 3-dehydroshikimic acid by the enzyme 3-dehydroquinate dehydratase, which is reduced to shikimic acid by the enzyme shikimate dehydrogenase, which uses nicotinamide adenine dinucleotide phosphate (NADPH) as a cofactor.

Shikimate pathway

Biosynthesis of the aromatic amino acids
The shikimate pathway is a seven-step metabolic route used by bacteria, fungi, algae, parasites, and plants for the biosynthesis of aromatic amino acids (phenylalanine, tyrosine, and tryptophan).  This pathway is not found in animals; therefore, phenylalanine and tryptophan represent essential amino acids that must be obtained from the animal's diet (animals can synthesise tyrosine from phenylalanine, and therefore is not an essential amino acid except for individuals unable to hydroxylate phenylalanine to tyrosine).

The seven enzymes involved in the shikimate pathway are DAHP synthase, 3-dehydroquinate synthase, 3-dehydroquinate dehydratase, shikimate dehydrogenase, shikimate kinase, EPSP synthase, and chorismate synthase. The pathway starts with two substrates, phosphoenol pyruvate and erythrose-4-phosphate and ends with chorismate, a substrate for the three aromatic amino acids. The fifth enzyme involved is the shikimate kinase, an enzyme that catalyzes the ATP-dependent phosphorylation of shikimate to form shikimate 3-phosphate (shown in the figure below). Shikimate 3-phosphate is then coupled with phosphoenol pyruvate to give 5-enolpyruvylshikimate-3-phosphate via the enzyme 5-enolpyruvylshikimate-3-phosphate (EPSP) synthase.

Then 5-enolpyruvylshikimate-3-phosphate is transformed into chorismate by a chorismate synthase.

Prephenic acid is then synthesized by a Claisen rearrangement of chorismate by chorismate mutase.

Prephenate is oxidatively decarboxylated with retention of the hydroxyl group to give p-hydroxyphenylpyruvate, which is transaminated using glutamate as the nitrogen source to give tyrosine and α-ketoglutarate.

Starting point in the biosynthesis of some phenolics 
Phenylalanine and tyrosine are the precursors used in the phenylpropanoids biosynthesis. The phenylpropanoids are then used to produce the flavonoids, coumarins, tannins and lignin. The first enzyme involved is phenylalanine ammonia-lyase (PAL) that converts L-phenylalanine to trans-cinnamic acid and ammonia.

Gallic acid biosynthesis 
Gallic acid is formed from 3-dehydroshikimate by the action of the enzyme shikimate dehydrogenase to produce 3,5-didehydroshikimate. This latter compound spontaneously rearranges to gallic acid.

Other compounds 
Shikimic acid is a precursor for:
 indole, indole derivatives and aromatic amino acid tryptophan and tryptophan derivatives such as the psychedelic compound dimethyltryptamine
 many alkaloids and other aromatic metabolites

Mycosporine-like amino acids 
Mycosporine-like amino acids are small secondary metabolites produced by organisms that live in environments with high volumes of sunlight, usually marine environments.

Uses 
In the pharmaceutical industry, shikimic acid from the Chinese star anise (Illicium verum) is used as a base material for production of oseltamivir (Tamiflu). Although shikimic acid is present in most autotrophic organisms, it is a biosynthetic intermediate and in general found in very low concentrations. The low isolation yield of shikimic acid from the Chinese star anise is blamed for the 2005 shortage of oseltamivir. Shikimic acid can also be extracted from the seeds of the sweetgum (Liquidambar styraciflua) fruit, which is abundant in North America, in yields of around 1.5%. For example,  of sweetgum seeds is needed for fourteen packages of Tamiflu. By comparison, star anise has been reported to yield 3% to 7% shikimic acid. Biosynthetic pathways in E. coli have recently been enhanced to allow the organism to accumulate enough material to be used commercially.  A 2010 study released by the University of Maine showed that shikimic acid can also be readily harvested from the needles of several species of pine tree.

Protecting groups are more commonly used in small-scale laboratory work and initial development than in industrial production processes because their use adds additional steps and material costs to the process. However, the availability of a cheap chiral building block can overcome these additional costs, for example, shikimic acid for oseltamivir.

Aminoshikimic acid is also an alternative to shikimic acid as a starting material for the synthesis of oseltamivir.

Target for drugs 
Shikimate can be used to synthesise (6S)-6-fluoroshikimic acid, an antibiotic which inhibits the aromatic biosynthetic pathway. More specifically, glyphosate inhibits the enzyme 5-enolpyruvylshikimate-3-phosphate synthase (EPSPS). "Roundup Ready" genetically modified crops overcome that inhibition.

Occurrence
It occurs in tree fern fronds, a specialty called fiddlehead (furled fronds of a young tree fern in the order Cyatheales, harvested for use as a vegetable). These fronds are edible, but can be roasted to remove shikimic acid.

Shikimic acid is also the glycoside part of some hydrolysable tannins. The acid is highly soluble in water and insoluble in nonpolar solvents, and this is why shikimic acid is active only against Gram-positive bacteria, due to outer cell membrane impermeability of Gram-negatives.

See also 
 Aminoshikimate pathway, a novel variation of the shikimate pathway

References

Books 
 
 

Biomolecules
Hydroxy acids
Cyclitols
Carboxylic acids
Cyclohexenols
Triols
Enoic acids